N. marginatus may refer to:
 Nannostomus marginatus, the dwarf pencilfish, a freshwater fish species found on the South American continent
 Nicrophorus marginatus, a burying beetle species

See also